Why? is a 1987 Czechoslovak drama film directed by Karel Smyczek. It was screened in the Un Certain Regard section at the 1988 Cannes Film Festival.

The film deals with the hooliganism in Czechoslovakia, particularly with the fans of football club Sparta from Prague, whose supporters were the pioneers of the football fan riots in Czechoslovakia, starting with hooligan actions already in the 1960s, like breaking the trains in which they travelled when they went on Sparta's away games. The film deals with one of such episodes.

Cast
 Jiří Langmajer as Jirka
 Pavlína Mourková as Marie
 Marketa Zmozkova as Anca
 Pavel Zvaric as Petr
 Martin Dejdar as Sury
 Jan Potměšil as Milan
 Daniel Landa as Pavel
 Miloslav Stibich as Train Passenger
 Miloš Kohout as Football Manager
 Michal Suchánek as Drunken Football Fan
 Jan Kraus as Football Fan
 Roman Holý as Football Fan
 Petr Vachler as Football Fan
 Antonín Jedlička as Man in a car
 Karel Smyczek as Reporter

Production
When sixteen Marketa Zmozkova won the audition, she and her parents were happy. However, when they saw the script included a rough sex scene, the smile on everyone's faces quickly disappeared. "Mr. Smyzcek and Mr. John had to come to our house and explain to Mom that it wouldn't be as awful as it looked on paper," Zmozkova said.

References

External links
 

1987 films
1987 drama films
Czechoslovak drama films
1980s Czech-language films
Films directed by Karel Smyczek
Czech association football films
Association football hooliganism
Golden Kingfisher winners
Czech drama films
1980s Czech films
Czech films based on actual events